Jingyang may refer to several places in China:

Jingyang County (泾阳县), of Xianyang, Shaanxi
Jingyang District (旌阳区), Deyang, Sichuan
Jingyang, Jingde County (旌阳镇), town in Jingde County, Anhui
Jingyang, Fuqing (镜洋镇), town in Fuqing, Fujian